The Botteniga is a river in Northern Italy, a distributary of the Piave, it meets the River Sile at Treviso after descending approximately 60 metres over its 20 kilometre course.

Rivers of the Province of Treviso
Rivers of Italy
Adriatic Italian coast basins